The 1942 Sheffield Park by-election was held on 27 August 1942.  The by-election was held due to the death of the incumbent Labour MP, George Lathan.  It was won by the unopposed Labour candidate Thomas Burden.

References

1942 in England
1942 elections in the United Kingdom
By-elections to the Parliament of the United Kingdom in Sheffield constituencies
Unopposed by-elections to the Parliament of the United Kingdom (need citation)
1940s in Sheffield